Galmer was an American racecar manufacturer that built cars used from 1992 through 1993 in CART competition and the Indianapolis 500. The cars were commissioned by the Galles Racing team. Although they were an American-based effort, spearheaded by Alan Mertens (galmerinc.com), the cars were actually assembled at the Galmer Engineering shop in Bicester, England.

Galmer Engineering was established in November 1988 by former March engineer Alan Mertens and CART team owner Rick Galles.

The Galmer chassis program came at a time in the CART series when interest in in-house chassis development was at its peak. The program followed in the footsteps of Penske, Truesports, and others (Porsche, etc.) who also had, or had previously attempted, similar in-house chassis programs. The name "Galmer" is a portmanteau of the surnames of Rick Galles and Alan Mertens.

The chassis' most notable accomplishment was Al Unser Jr.'s win at the 1992 Indianapolis 500 in the closest finish in race history. One other CART race was won with the chassis by Danny Sullivan in 1992. In the 1992 CART season, Unser Jr. scored 15 top-ten finishes in 16 races (the other finish was an 11th), en route to third place in the final championship standings. Sullivan had 11 top-tens, finishing 7th in points.

The 1992 season was the only year the chassis was utilized in a full-time capacity. Though it was not openly revealed at the time, the decision for Galles Racing to ultimately shelve the Galmer project was made on the morning of the 1992 Indianapolis 500, the same race that Unser Jr. went on to win.

In 1993, the car was used on a part-time basis by Dominic Dobson. Proving uncompetitive, the car was retired never to be raced in CART competition again. Only those three men ever raced a Galmer in CART competition, yet it won two races, making it one of the most successful chassis on a per-race basis.

At the end of the 1993 season, Rick Galles sold the company's stake to Bruce McCaw of Packwest Racing, and for the next five years Galmer had been researching and developing McCaw's team (PacWest).

Galmer attempted to enter Formula One in 1993 with a takeover of the defunct Brabham team,  however the effort failed as a result of financial problems.

Transponder Placement 
The Galmer chassis had one unique characteristic compared to its chassis counterparts in the CART series in 1992. It was standard for all cars to mount their scoring transponder in the left side pod of the car. The Galmer chassis, however, did not have room in that location. The cars of Unser Jr. and Sullivan instead had the transponders placed in the nosecone of the car.

Due to the proximity of the transponder, Unser Jr.'s official race-winning margin of 0.043 seconds over Scott Goodyear in the 1992 Indianapolis 500 was deemed inconclusive. After further consideration, USAC officials calculated the true margin of victory to be narrower, at 0.0331 seconds. The official margin, however, would remain in the record book.

After the 1992 season was over, Valvoline purchased the race-winning Galmer chassis driven by Unser Jr. On frequent occasions, it is used for display at various engagements.

Complete Indy Car World Series results
(key)

References

Indianapolis 500
American Championship racing cars
American racecar constructors